CKYX-FM is an FM radio station serving Fort McMurray, Alberta with an active rock format branded as 97.9 Rock. The station received approval by the CRTC in 1984 to broadcast at 97.9 MHz.

CKYX also has a rebroadcaster on Tar Island at 95.7 MHz.

References

External links
97.9 Rock
 

KYX
KYX
KYX
Radio stations established in 1985
1985 establishments in Alberta